Pierre Duval is the name of:
 Pierre Duval (geographer) (1618–1683), French geographer
 Pierre Duval (singer) (born 1932), French-Canadian operatic tenor
 Pierre Duval, a pseudonym used by Remy Chauvin (1913–2009), French entomologist and parapsychological writer
 Pierre Duval Le Camus (1790–1854), a French painter and lithographer